The Philadelphia Wings are a lacrosse team based in Philadelphia playing in the National Lacrosse League (NLL). The 2012 season was the 26th in franchise history.

In August, the Wings pulled off a blockbuster trade with the Edmonton Rush, sending star forward Athan Iannucci to the Rush along with Alex Turner, Brodie MacDonald, and three first round draft picks for two-time Transition Player of the Year Brodie Merrill, Dean Hill, Mike MacLellan, and two low draft picks. A month later, the look of the team changed even more dramatically, as the Wings landed superstar forward Dan Dawson in the Boston Blazers dispersal draft. The 2012 version of Boston's "big three" was completed when the Wings picked up star Stony Brook forward Kevin Crowley first overall in the entry draft.

The significant roster changes didn't help the Wings in their first game of the year, a 22-12 pounding at the hands of the Rochester Knighthawks. But the Wings settled down and won four of their next five games, and seven of ten to take the lead in the East division. The wheels fell off at the end of March, however, as the Wings lost an overtime game to the Colorado Mammoth, and then lost their next four. The losing streak included three games at home, and the Wings didn't score more than ten goals in any of their last four games.

They finished in third place in the East with a 7-9 record and made the playoffs. They traveled to Rochester to face the Knighthawks, who had beaten them three times already this season. In only their third playoff game since winning the Championship in 2001, the Wings came up a goal short, losing to the Knighthawks 14-13.

Regular season

Conference standings

Game log
Reference:

Playoffs
Reference:

Transactions

Trades

Dispersal Draft
The Wings chose the following players in the Boston Blazers dispersal draft:

Entry draft
The 2011 NLL Entry Draft took place on September 21, 2011. The Wings selected the following players:

Roster

See also
2012 NLL season

References

Philadelphia Wings seasons
2012 in lacrosse
Phil